Malaria is a 1943 French drama film directed by Jean Gourguet and starring Mireille Balin, Sessue Hayakawa and Jacques Dumesnil.

The film's sets were designed by the art director Robert Dumesnil.

Synopsis
In the French colonial empire a love triangle develops between two men and a woman. She begins having an affair with a man who promises to take her back to Europe and away from the tropical colony which she finds like a prison. However a native servant overhears them and then mysteriously disappears, leading to suspicions of murders.

Cast
 Mireille Balin as Madeleine Barral 
 Sessue Hayakawa as Saïdi 
 Jacques Dumesnil as Jean Barral 
 Jean Debucourt as Le docteur Cyril 
 Michel Vitold as Henri Malfas 
 Alexandre Rignault as Le père Dalmar 
 Charles Lemontier as Ginès 
 Marcel Maupi as Zanzi 
 Paul Demange as Moniz 
 Michel Salina as Dago 
 François Viguier as Kilouaki

References

Bibliography 
 Kennedy-Karpat, Colleen. Rogues, Romance, and Exoticism in French Cinema of the 1930s. Fairleigh Dickinson, 2013.

External links 
 

1943 films
1943 drama films
French drama films
1940s French-language films
Films directed by Jean Gourguet
1940s French films